Rzeplin may refer to the following places in Poland:
Rzeplin, Lower Silesian Voivodeship (south-west Poland)
Rzeplin, Lesser Poland Voivodeship (south Poland)
Rzeplin, Lublin Voivodeship (east Poland)
Rzeplin, Subcarpathian Voivodeship (south-east Poland)